Fletazepam is a drug which is a benzodiazepine derivative. It has sedative and anxiolytic effects similar to those produced by other benzodiazepine derivatives, but is mainly notable for its strong muscle relaxant properties.

Fletazepam is most closely related to other N-trifluoroethyl substituted benzodiazepines such as halazepam and quazepam.

See also 
Benzodiazepine

References 

Benzodiazepines
Chloroarenes
GABAA receptor positive allosteric modulators
Trifluoromethyl compounds
Fluoroarenes